The following is a list of state highways in the U.S. state of Louisiana designated in the 51-100 range prior to the 1955 Louisiana Highway renumbering.


Louisiana State Route 51

Louisiana State Route 52

Louisiana State Route 52 ran  in a general east–west direction from US 171/US 190/State Route 42 southeast of DeRidder, Beauregard Parish to the junction of US 165/State Route 24 and State Route 25 in Oberlin, Allen Parish.

Louisiana State Route 53

Louisiana State Route 53 ran  in a north–south direction from State Route 1 in LaPlace to the junction of State Route 33 and State Route 1141 in Frenier, St. John the Baptist Parish.  Most of the route was concurrent with US 51.

Louisiana State Route 54

Louisiana State Route 55

Louisiana State Route 55 ran  in a north–south direction from the junction of US 79/US 80/State Route 4 in Shreveport, Caddo Parish to the Arkansas state line north of Ida.  The route was entirely concurrent with US 71.  The above mileage reflects a gap in the route between Dixie and Gilliam, as that portion of the highway was being relocated at the time of the 1955 Louisiana Highway renumbering.

Louisiana State Route 56

Louisiana State Route 56 ran  in a general east–west direction from US 90/State Route 2 in New Iberia to a dead end at Lake Dauterive in Iberia Parish.

Much of the route became a portion of LA 86 in the 1955 renumbering; the section from Loreauville to Lake Dauterive became LA 3242.

Louisiana State Route 57

Louisiana State Route 57 ran  in a general north–south direction, existing as two disconnected sections.  The southern portion extended from State Route 5 north of Marksville, Avoyelles Parish to State Route 123 northeast of Holloway, Rapides Parish.  The northern portion extended from a dead end at the Little River to the junction of US 84, State Route 6, and State Route 19 in Jena, LaSalle Parish.

SR 57 became a portion of LA 107 in the 1955 renumbering.

Louisiana State Route 57-D

Louisiana State Route 57-D ran  in a general east–west direction, branching off of State Route 57 north of Effie, Avoyelles Parish and extending to US 165/State Route 14 in Pineville, Rapides Parish.

SR 57-D became a portion of LA 107 in the 1955 renumbering.

Louisiana State Route 58

Louisiana State Route 59

Louisiana State Route 60

Louisiana State Route 60 ran  in a north–south direction from a dead end at East Cote Blanche Bay to US 90/State Route 2 in Centerville, St. Mary Parish.

SR 60 was renumbered as LA 317 in the 1955 renumbering.

Louisiana State Route 61

Louisiana State Route 61 ran  in a north–south direction from State Route 1 in Chalmette, St. Bernard Parish to US 90/State Route 2 in New Orleans, Orleans Parish.

SR 61 was renumbered to LA 47 in the 1955 renumbering.

Louisiana State Route 62

Louisiana State Route 62 ran  in a north–south direction from a dead end in Delacroix to State Route 32 west of Yscloskey, St. Bernard Parish.

Louisiana State Route 63

Louisiana State Route 63 ran  in a general north–south direction from State Route 1 in Geismar, Ascension Parish to a second junction with State Route 1 in Baton Rouge, East Baton Rouge Parish.

SR 63 was renumbered to LA 30 in the 1955 renumbering.

Louisiana State Route 64

Louisiana State Route 64 ran  in a north–south direction from State Route 17 northeast of Columbia, Caldwell Parish to State Route 47 south of Rayville, Richland Parish.

Louisiana State Route 65

Louisiana State Route 66

Louisiana State Route 67

Louisiana State Route 67 ran  in a general east–west direction in two disconnected segments.  The western portion extended from State Route 15 at Foules, Catahoula Parish to a dead end at the Tensas River.  The route resumed on the opposite bank of the river in Tensas Parish, extending to US 65/State Route 3 in Waterproof.

Louisiana State Route 68

Louisiana State Route 68 ran  in a north–south direction from State Route 18 in Harrisonburg to the junction of US 165/State Route 14 and State Route 110 in Grayson.

Louisiana State Route 69

Louisiana State Route 70

Louisiana State Route 71

Louisiana State Route 71 ran in a west–east direction from Chipola to Clifton. SR 71 formerly turned south and overlapped current LA 25 to Franklinton, but this was removed after 1937.

SR 71 became a portion of LA 38 in the 1955 renumbering.

Louisiana State Route 72

Louisiana State Route 72 ran  in a general east–west direction from State Route 5 west of Fifth Ward to State Route C-1471 in Mansura, Avoyelles Parish.

SR 72 became a portion of LA 114 in the 1955 renumbering.

Louisiana State Route 72-D

Louisiana State Route 72-D was the former routing of SR 72 through Echo Community.

Louisiana State Route 73

Louisiana State Route 73 ran  in a north–south direction from State Route 1 west of Port Allen to State Route 30 in Erwinville, West Baton Rouge Parish.

Louisiana State Route 74

Louisiana State Route 74 ran  in a north–south direction from SR 3 (now US 61) near Lindsay to SR 35 near Jackson.

The route became a portion of LA 68 in the 1955 renumbering.

Louisiana State Route 75

Louisiana State Route 76

Louisiana State Route 76 ran  in an east–west direction from State Route 48 southwest of Newlight to State Route C-2171 in Newellton, Tensas Parish.

The route became a portion of LA 4 in the 1955 renumbering.

Louisiana State Route 77

Louisiana State Route 78

Louisiana State Route 79

Louisiana State Route 80

Louisiana State Route 81

Louisiana State Route 81 ran  in a south–north direction from Sea Breeze to Montegut.

The route became the southern portion of LA 55 in the 1955 renumbering.

Louisiana State Route 82

Louisiana State Route 83

Louisiana State Route 84

Louisiana State Route 85

Louisiana State Route 85 ran  in an east–west direction from State Route 21 in Hineston to US 165/State Route 205 north of Forest Hill, Rapides Parish.

Louisiana State Route 86

Louisiana State Route 86 ran  in an east–west direction from St. Martinville to Catahoula.

The route became the eastern portion of LA 96 in the 1955 renumbering.

Louisiana State Route 87

Louisiana State Route 88

Louisiana State Route 89

Louisiana State Route 90

Louisiana State Route 91

Louisiana State Route 91 ran  in a north–south direction from Norwood to Slaughter.

The route became the northern portion of LA 19 in the 1955 renumbering.

Louisiana State Route 92

Louisiana State Route 92 ran  in a general north–south direction from US 71/State Route 1 in Morrow, St. Landry Parish to State Route 30 in Cottonport, Avoyelles Parish.

SR 92 became a portion of LA 107 in the 1955 renumbering.

Louisiana State Route 93

Louisiana State Route 93 ran  in a general north–south direction from State Route 30 at Lakeland to a second junction with Route 30 in New Roads, Pointe Coupee Parish.

Louisiana State Route 94

Louisiana State Route 94 ran  in a general north–south direction from State Route 1288 north of Lake Providence to State Route 3-D at Highland.

Louisiana State Route 95

Louisiana State Route 96

Louisiana State Route 97

Louisiana State Route 98

Louisiana State Route 98 ran  in a general west–east direction from Holmwood to Lake Arthur.

The route became a portion of LA 14 in the 1955 renumbering.

Louisiana State Route 99

References